The 1954–55 season was Manchester United's 53rd season in the Football League, and their tenth consecutive season in the top division of English football. United finished fifth in the league. Their top scorer was Dennis Viollet, with 21 goals. Departing the club at the end of the season was veteran forward Jack Rowley after 18 years at Old Trafford. With younger players continuing to form the mainstay of the side, several more made their debuts this season, including Dublin born forward Billy Whelan who made his senior debut just before his 20th birthday.

First Division

FA Cup

Squad statistics

References

Manchester United F.C. seasons
Manchester United